Heuss may refer to:

Elly Heuss-Knapp (1881–1952), German politician 
Theodor Heuss (1884–1963), West German liberal politician who served as the first President of the Federal Republic of Germany from 1949 to 1959
Heuss l'Enfoiré (born 1992), French rapper of Algerian descent

See also
Theodor-Heuss-Platz, Berlin
Theodor Heuss Bridge (Mainz-Wiesbaden), an arch bridge over the Rhine River
Theodor Heuss Bridge (Düsseldorf), a cable-stayed bridge over the Rhine River in Düsseldorf
Theodor Heuss Bridge (Frankenthal), a bridge that spans the Rhine River along Autobahn 6
Theodor-Heuss-Gymnasium Heilbronn